ZENworks, a suite of software products developed and maintained by Micro Focus International for computer systems management, aims to manage the entire life cycle of servers, of desktop PCs (Windows, Linux or Mac), of laptops, and of handheld devices such as Android and iOS mobile phones and tablets.  Novell planned to include Full Disk Encryption (FDE) functionality within ZENworks.
ZENworks supports multiple server platforms and multiple directory services.

History 
The name, "ZENworks", first appeared as "Z.E.N.works" in 1998 with ZENworks 1.0
and with ZENworks Starter Pack - a limited version of ZENworks 1.0 that came bundled with NetWare 5.0 (1998). Novell added server-management functionality, and the product grew into a suite consisting of:

 "ZENworks for Desktops" (ZfD)
 "ZENworks for Servers" (ZfS)
 "ZENworks for Handhelds" (ZfH)

Novell has continued to add components to the suite, which it sells under the consolidated name "ZENworks Suite".

The initial ZENworks products had a tight integration with Novell Directory Service (NDS). With the release of ZENworks Configuration Management 10 (2007) the product architecture completely changed, the product became directory agnostic and ZENworks Suite products were integrated into a single management framework.

ZENworks Releases:

Elements of the ZENworks Suite 
In the latest version of ZENworks known as ZENworks 2017 the ZENworks Suite consists of seven individual products:

Additionally, Novell offers an ITIL version of "Novell Service Desk". This version is ITIL-certified by PinkVERIFY and supports ten ITIL v3 processes, e.g. Change, Incident, Problem and Service Level Management.

In terms of implementation, the ZENworks Agent (also known as the "ZENworks Management Daemon" or "zmd") installs, updates and removes software. The ZENworks Configuration Management (ZCM) addresses patching, endpoint security, asset management and provisioning.

See also 
 Systems Management
 Patch Management
 Mobile Device Management
 Full Disk Encryption
 Antimalware

References

Further reading

External links 
 Novell ZENworks Product page

ZENworks
Remote administration software
System administration